Pagyda griseotincta is a moth in the family Crambidae. It was described by Aristide Caradja in 1939. It is found in Sichuan, China.

References

Moths described in 1939
Pyraustinae